Silvestri is a surname of Italian origin. Noted people with this last name include:

 Alan Silvestri (born 1950), American composer
 Alessandra Silvestri-Levy (born 1972), Italo-Brazilian curator, writer and humanitarian activist
 Angelica di Silvestri (born 1965), Dominican cross-country skier of Italian origin
 Carlos Silvestri (born 1972), Peruvian football manager and former player
 Charles Anthony Silvestri (born 1965), American poet, lyricist and historian
 Constantin Silvestri (1913–1969), Romanian conductor
 Cristian Silvestri (born 1975), Italian footballer
 Daniele Silvestri (born 1968), Italian singer-songwriter and musician
 Dave Silvestri (born 1967), American baseball player
 Davide Silvestri (born 1980), Italian cyclist
 Debora Silvestri (born 1998), Italian professional racing cyclist
 Enrico Silvestri (1896–1977), Italian Alpini officer and skier
 Federico Silvestri (born 1963), Italian swimmer
 Fernando Silvestri (1896–1959), Italian Air Force general 
 Filippo Silvestri (1873–1949), Italian entomologist
 Graciela Silvestri (born 1954), Argentine architect and professor
 Jacobelli Silvestri, (died 1516), Italian Roman Catholic bishop
 Jacopo Silvestri (15th century – 16th century), Italian cryptographer and author
 Ken Silvestri (1916–1992), American baseball player
 Lorenzo De Silvestri (born 1988), Italian footballer
 Louis Silvestri, bass singer with the original Four Aces
 Luigi Silvestri (born 1993), Italian professional footballer
 Marc Silvestri (born 1958), American comic book artist
 Marco Silvestri (born 1991), Italian footballer
 Marco Silvestri (born 1999), Italian footballer
 Max Silvestri (born 1983), American stand-up comedian
 Nicola Silvestri, (born 1985), Italian footballer
 Orazio Silvestri (1835–1890), Italian geologist and volcanologist
 Orlando Silvestri (born 1972), American football player
 Paolo Silvestri (born 1967), Italian freestyle skier
 Papirio Silvestri (1592–1659), Roman Catholic prelate who served as Bishop of Macerata e Tolentino
 Peter N. Silvestri (born 1957), a village president of Elmwood Park and a commissioner of Cook County, Illinois
 Russ Silvestri (born 1961), American sailor
 Tommaso Silvestri (born 1990), Italian footballer
 Umberto Silvestri (1915–2009), Italian wrestler

See also
 Silvestrii (disambiguation) 
 Silvestris (disambiguation)

External links
Distribution of Silvestri surname

Surnames
Italian-language surnames
Patronymic surnames
Surnames from given names